Hydrazinium nitroformate (HNF) is a salt of hydrazine and nitroform (trinitromethane).  It has the molecular formula  and is soluble in most solvents.

Hydrazinium nitroformate is an energetic oxidizer. Research is being conducted at the European Space Agency to investigate its use in solid rocket propellants.  It tends to produce propellants which burn very rapidly and with very high combustion efficiency.  Its high energy leads to high specific impulse propellants.  It is currently an expensive research chemical available only in limited quantities. A disadvantage of HNF is its limited thermal stability.

References

Rocket fuels
Hydrazinium compounds
Nitroalkanes